The Kissworld Tour was a concert tour by the American rock band Kiss. The tour marked the return of the Creatures of the Night costumes which had previously been seen on the sixth annual Kiss Kruise. The tour began on May 1, 2017, in Moscow, Russia and concluded in Viveiro, Spain on July 14, 2018.

In the tour program for the band's final tour, both Thayer and Singer reflected on the tour:

Reception
Ben Siegel from The Buffalo News described the Niagara Falls concert as "These guys are insane entertainers. They’re intense. They’re flammable. Simmons’s mouth, and that infamously long tongue of his, drip with (stage) blood. They own this genre of hard rock. They invented it."

Setlists

Europe setlist (2017)
"Deuce"
"Shout It Out Loud"
"Lick It Up"
"I Love It Loud"
"Firehouse"
"Shock Me"
"Flaming Youth"
"God of Thunder" 
"Crazy Crazy Nights"
"War Machine"
"Say Yeah"
"Psycho Circus"
"Black Diamond"
"Rock and Roll All Nite"
Encore
"I Was Made for Lovin' You"
"Detroit Rock City"

North America setlist
"Deuce"
"Shout It Out Loud"
"Lick It Up"
"I Love It Loud"
"Love Gun"
"Firehouse"
"Shock Me"
"Flaming Youth"
"God of Thunder"
"Say Yeah"
"War Machine"
"Psycho Circus"
"Black Diamond"
"Rock and Roll All Nite"
Encore
"Cold Gin"
"Detroit Rock City"

Europe setlist (2018)
"Deuce"
"Shout It Out Loud"
"War Machine"
"Firehouse"
"Shock Me"
"Say Yeah"
"I Love It Loud"
"Flaming Youth"
"Calling Dr. Love"
"Lick It Up"
"God of Thunder"
"I Was Made for Lovin' You"
"Love Gun"
"Black Diamond"
Encore
"Cold Gin"
"Detroit Rock City"
"Rock and Roll All Nite"

Tour dates

Cancelled shows

Personnel

Kiss
Paul Stanley – vocals, rhythm guitar
Gene Simmons – vocals, bass
Tommy Thayer – lead guitar, vocals
Eric Singer – drums, vocals

References

2017 concert tours
2018 concert tours
Kissworld